Inverurie Academy is a secondary school in Inverurie, Aberdeenshire. The school is one of the 42 secondary schools run by Aberdeenshire Council. Inverurie Academy is located on Jackson Street, Inverurie.

History
Built in the Victorian Period, the school was originally split into both a secondary school and a primary, although after Market Place the need for a primary decreased and the building was merged in 1909, keeping primary pupils until the statutory leaving age of 14, the other taking the pupils who had passed their Qualifying exam on to higher education.  This was the founding of the building known as Inverurie Academy. Since then, new parts of the school have been added, the most recent in the mid 1980s. A new building is scheduled to be built to replace the old in 2020.

The buildings remained that way until they were joined in the 1950s, and amalgamated in the 1960s with the building of the new Assembly Hall. The final stage of building was constructed in the 1980s.
The school will be transitioning to the newly built Inverurie Community Campus in the 2020/2021 school year.

References

Secondary schools in Aberdeenshire
1909 establishments in Scotland
Educational institutions established in 1909
Inverurie